The 1913 season of the Paraguayan Primera División, the top category of Paraguayan football, was played by 5 teams. The national champions were Cerro Porteño.

Results

Standings

External links
Paraguay 1913 season at RSSSF

Paraguayan Primera División seasons
Para
1